Mettuguda is a neighbourhood in Secunderabad of Hyderabad city in the Indian state of Telangana.

Mettuguda is divided into three regions: Mettuguda, Alugadda Bbavi and New Mettuguda. These are divided by Mettuguda Y Junction. Hindu temples there include Temple Ayyappa and Uma Mesheshwara Temple. St. Anthony's shrine and CSI St. Marks Church are also located there. Railway hospital in Mettuguda is very famous. There is also a graveyard from British times. Railway Hospital, Rail kalyan, Railway officers Club, Railway Recruitment Board, Railway Quarters and Officers Bungalow are also located in Mettuguda.

Transport
The inner ring road and Warangal Highway pass through Mettuguda. Nearby neighbourhoods are Malkajgiri, Tarnaka, Secunderabad and Sitaphalmandi.

Mettuguda metro station is close by making commutation very convenient.

Neighbourhoods in Hyderabad, India
Geography of Secunderabad